The English Software Company, later shortened to English Software, was a Manchester, UK-based video game developer and publisher that operated from 1982 until 1987. Starting with its first release, the horizontally scrolling shooter Airstrike, English Software focused on the Atari 8-bit family of home computers, then later expanded onto other platforms. The company used the slogan "The power of excitement".

History 
The company was set up in 1982 by Philip Morris, owner of the Gemini Electronics computer store in Manchester, to release video games for the Atari 8-bit family. By the end of 1983, English Software was the largest producer of Atari 8-bit software in the UK and Morris closed Gemini Electronics to concentrate on English Software.

The company continued to concentrate on the Atari 8-bit market but also released games for other home computers including Commodore 64, BBC Micro, Acorn Electron, Amstrad CPC, ZX Spectrum, Atari ST, and Amiga.

Popular games include platformers Jet-Boot Jack (1983) and Henry's House (1984), racer Elektra Glide (1985), the multi-event Knight Games (1986) and shoot 'em up Leviathan (1987).
     
English had licensing deals that saw some of their games released internationally e.g. through Dynamics Marketing in Germany and Datamost in the US. A number of English's games were sold at budget price by Mastertronic in the US, which included exclusive ports such as the Atari version of Henry's House and the IBM PC compatible version of Knight Games. Philip Morris said in 2013 that he did not license the Atari version to Mastertronic UK, even though English Software had the option to do this.

Games

1982
Airstrike (Atari 8-bit)
Time Warp (Atari 8-bit)

1983
Airstrike II (Atari 8-bit)
Batty Builders (Atari 8-bit)
Bombastic! (Atari 8-bit) aka Bomb Blast It!
Captain Sticky's Gold (Atari 8-bit)
Jet-Boot Jack (Atari 8-bit, Commodore 64, BBC Micro, Acorn Electron, Amstrad CPC)
Krazy Kopter (Atari 8-bit)
Neptune's Daughter (Commodore 64, Atari 8-bit)
Steeple Jack (Atari 8-bit)
Xenon Raid (Atari 8-bit)

1984
The Adventures of Robin Hood (Atari 8-bit)
Colossus Chess 3.0 (Atari 8-bit)
Henry's House (Commodore 64), released for the Atari 8-bit by Mastertronic
Legend of the Knucker-Hole (Commodore 64)
Spaceman Sid (BBC Micro, Acorn Electron)
Stranded (Atari 8-bit, Commodore 64), ports of the BBC/Electron game first published by Superior Software

1985
Chop Suey (Atari 8-bit)
Elektra Glide (Atari 8-bit, Commodore 64, Amstrad CPC)
Hijack! (Atari 8-bit)
Kissin' Kousins (Acorn Electron, Atari 8-bit, BBC Micro)
Mediator (Atari 8-bit, Commodore 64)
Timeslip (Atari 8-bit, Commodore 16, Plus/4)
Topper the Copper (Commodore 64)

1986
Knight Games (Commodore 64, Amstrad CPC), ported to PC by Mastertronic
 Q-Ball (Atari ST, Amiga)

1987
 Leviathan (Commodore 64, Amstrad CPC, ZX Spectrum, Atari ST, Amiga)
 Octapolis (Commodore 64)
 Knight Games 2: Space Trilogy (Commodore 64)

References 

Atari 8-bit family
Video game companies established in 1982
Video game companies disestablished in 1987
Defunct video game companies of the United Kingdom
1982 establishments in England
1987 disestablishments in England
Defunct companies based in Manchester